The 2022 Butler Bulldogs football team represented Butler University  as a member of the Pioneer Football League (PFL) during the 2022 NCAA Division I FCS football season. They were led by first-year head coach Mike Uremovich and played their home games at Bud and Jackie Sellick Bowl.

Previous season

The Bulldogs finished the 2021 season with a record of 3–8, 1–7 Pioneer League play to finish in tenth place. On November 30, Jeff Voris resigned after 16 seasons. He finished with a record of 80–85. Mike Uremovich was named their next head coach.

Schedule

Game Summaries

St. Thomas (FL)

Taylor

at No. 2 South Dakota State

at Davidson

Dayton

at Valparaiso

Marist

Morehead State

at San Diego

at Drake

St. Thomas (MN)

References

Butler
Butler Bulldogs football seasons
Butler Bulldogs football